Summer soldier may refer to:

 Summer soldier, a term used in Thomas Paine's pamphlet The American Crisis.
 Summer Soldiers (film), a 1972 film by director Hiroshi Teshigahara
 Summer Soldier, a 1972 song by Barclay James Harvest from their album Baby James Harvest
 Summer Soldier, a 1972 song by Brave Belt from their album Brave Belt II
 The Summer Soldier, a 1978 novel by Nicholas Guild